The Master of Taiga is a 1968 Soviet crime film directed by Vladimir Nazarov.

Plot 
The film takes place in one village in which the store is robbed. A forest rafter admits a crime, but the young detective doubts it.

Cast 
 Valeriy Zolotukhin as Detective Vasili Snezhkin
 Vladimir Vysotskiy
 Lionella Pyryeva
 Mikhail Kokshenov
 Dmitry Masanov
 Leonid Kmit
 Eduard Bredun
 Ivan Kosykh		
 Pavel Shpringfeld	
 Vladimir Lippart

References

External links 
 

1968 films
1960s Russian-language films
Soviet crime films
1968 crime films